Nihal Chand may refer to:

 Nihâl Chand (1710–1782), Indian painter
 Nihalchand (born 1971), Indian politician